Tha Mixtape is the first mixtape by Naughty by Nature featuring Garden State Greats.  The mixtape featured the single "Gotta Lotta" and is meant as a preview to their upcoming studio album Anthem Inc..

Track listing
 "Church" - 0:53
 "Respect" - 4:13
 "Hood Shit" - 3:41
 "Gotta Lotta" - 3:33
 "Kill Tha Beat" - 3:52
 "Heavy In My Chevy" - 4:33
 "After My Chedda" - 2:50
 "Tha Corner" - 2:30
 "So Many Things" - 4:25

External links
Tha Mixtape

Naughty by Nature albums
2010 mixtape albums